Russian Mountains were a predecessor to the roller coaster, in which the term is adopted by several Romance languages in other parts of Europe. The earliest roller coasters were descended from Russian winter sled rides held on specially constructed hills of ice. Sometimes, wheeled carts were used instead of tracks, like in the  built in Catherine II's residence in Oranienbaum. The first such wheeled ride was brought to Paris in 1804 under the name  (French for "Russian Mountains").

Description 
In the 18th century they were especially popular in St. Petersburg and surroundings, from where their usage and popularity spread to the rest of Europe.

Sometimes, wheeled carts were used instead of tracks, like in the  built in Catherine II's residence in Oranienbaum. By the late 18th century, their popularity was such that entrepreneurs elsewhere began copying the idea, using wheeled cars built on tracks. The first such wheeled ride was brought to Paris in 1804 under the name  (French for "Russian Mountains").

Early builders
The first loop track was probably also built in Paris from an English design in 1846, with a single-person wheeled sled running through a  diameter loop. None of these tracks were complete circuits.

In modern times
To this day, a number of Romance languages (e.g. French: montagnes russes, Italian: montagne russe, Portuguese: montanha-russa, Spanish: montaña rusa) use the equivalent of "Russian Mountains" to refer to roller coasters. For example, the second largest amusement park in St. Petersburg has an  ride.

See also
 Montaña Rusa (La Feria Chapultepec Mágico)

References

Bibliography 
 
 
 

Amusement rides
Russian inventions